This is the songwriting discography of Sean Garrett.

Writing discography

2004

Janet Jackson - Damita Jo
05. "My Baby" (featuring Kanye West)
 Produced By Kanye West & Jimmy Jam & Terry Lewis

Usher - Confessions
02. "Yeah!" (featuring Lil Jon & Ludacris)
 Produced By Lil Jon
19. "Red Light"

Ciara - Goodies
01. "Goodies" (featuring Petey Pablo)
 Produced By Lil' Jon
08. "Ooh Baby"
 Produced By Flash Technology

Destiny's Child - Destiny Fulfilled
01. "Lose My Breath"

00. "Gots My Own" (Japan Bonus Track)
 Both Produced By Rodney Jerkins
02. "Soldier" (featuring T.I. and Lil Wayne)
 Produced By Rich Harrison
04. "T-Shirt"
 Produced By Dre & Vidal
05. "Is She the Reason"

06. "Girl"

00. "Game Over" (International Bonus Track)
 All Produced By 9th Wonder
10. "Through with Love"
 Produced By Mario Winans

2005

B5 - B5
03. "Dance 4U"

00. "Nothin' Bout Me"
 Both Produced By Ryan Leslie

Mary J. Blige - The Breakthrough
02. "Enough Cryin"
 Produced By Rodney Jerkins
06. "Good Woman Down"
 Produced By 9th Wonder
18. "Show Love" (International Bonus Track)
 Produced By Chucky Thompson

Mario - Turning Point
01. "18" (featuring Cassidy)

03. "Couldn't Say No"
 Both Produced By Ron "Neff-U" Feemster and "Couldn't Say No" produced by Scott Storch too

112 - Pleasure & Pain
10. "If I Hit" (featuring T.I.)
 Produced By Mario Winans

Amerie - Touch
03. "Touch"
 Produced By Lil Jon

Chris Brown - Chris Brown
02. "Run It!" (featuring Juelz Santana)

05. "Gimme That"
 Both Produced By Scott Storch

Teairra Marí - Roc-A-Fella Presents: Teairra Mari
01. "Make Her Feel Good"
 Produced By The Co-Stars & Sean Garrett
02. "No Daddy"
 Produced By Blackout Movement
07. "La La"
 Produced By TrackBoyz & Sean Garrett
09. "Phone Booth"
 Produced By Bryan Michael Cox & Sean Garrett
10. "Confidential"
 Produced By Sean Garrett
13. "You Better Recognize" (Japanese Bonus)
 Produced By Sean Garrett

Various artists - "In The Mix OST"
04. Chris Brown - "Which One" (featuring Noah)

Omarion - O
05. "Drop That Heater"
 Produced By ARTTHEBEAT

Donell Jones - Journey of a Gemini
02. "Better Start Talking" (featuring Jermaine Dupri)

12. "If U Want" (featuring Bun B)

00. "Hands On You" (International Bonus Track)
 All Produced By Ryan Leslie

2006

Destiny's Child / Beyoncé - #1's / B'Day
00. "Check on It" (featuring Slim Thug) (Bonus Track)
 Produced By Swizz Beatz

The Pussycat Dolls - PCD
05. "Buttons"
 Produced By Polow Da Don

3LW - Point of No Return
00. "Ain't Enough"
 Produced By Sean Garrett & Oak

Fergie - The Dutchess
04. "London Bridge"
 Produced By Polow da Don

Beyoncé - B'Day
02. "Get Me Bodied"

04. "Upgrade U"

05. "Ring the Alarm"

00. "Lost Yo Mind"
 All Produced By Swizz Beatz

08. "Green Light"
 Produced By The Neptunes

DMX - Year of the Dog...Again
07. "Dog Love" (featuring Amerie)
 Produced By Chad Elliot & Eddie Timmons

Kelis - Kelis Was Here
02. "Blindfold Me" (featuring Nas)
 Produced By Polow da Don
06. "Bossy" (featuring Too Short)

15. "Handful"
 Both Produced By Shondrae "Bangladesh" Crawford

Fantasia - Fantasia
05. "Not The Way That I Do"
 Produced By Kwame "K-1 Mil" Holland

Diddy - Press Play
16. "Thought U Said" (featuring Brandy)
 Produced By Mario Winans
18. "Making It Hard" (featuring Mary J. Blige)
 Produced By Rich Harrison

Jamie Foxx - Unpredictable
03. "DJ Play a Love Song" (featuring Twista)
 Produced By Polow da Don

Jay-Z - Kingdom Come
12. "Dig a Hole" (featuring Sterling Simms)
 Produced By Swizz Beatz

JoJo - The High Road
01. "This Time"
 Produced By Scott Storch
02. "The Way You Do Me"
 Produced By Swizz Beatz

Gwen Stefani - The Sweet Escape
05. "Now That You Got It"
 Produced By Swizz Beatz

Monica - The Makings of Me
05. "Hell No (Leave Home)" (featuring Twista)
 Produced By Bryan Michael Cox & Sean Garrett
00. "Thanks For The Misery" (Non-album Track)
 Produced By Anthony Dent

2007

Che'Nelle - Things Happen for a Reason
04. "Hurry up"

08. "Lookin'"
 Both Produced By Sean Garrett &  Oak

Ciara - Ciara: The Evolution
11. "Bang It Up"
 Produced By Polow da Don

Britney Spears - Blackout
08. "Toy Soldier"
 Produced By Bloodshy & Avant

00."Pull Out"
 Produced By Lil Jon

00. "Kiss You All Over"
 Produced By Brian Kidd
00. "Red Carpet"

00. "Love"

Cassidy - B.A.R.S. The Barry Adrian Reese Story
00. "Untitled"

Nicole Scherzinger - Her Name Is Nicole
00. "Whatever U Like" (featuring T.I.)
 Produced By Polow da Don
00. "Winning Women" (featuring Rihanna)
 Produced By Sean Garrett & Clubba Langg

Kelly Rowland - Ms. Kelly
01. "Like This" (featuring Eve)
 Produced By Polow da Don
00. "Time By Myself"
 Produced By Warren "Oak" Felder

Enrique Iglesias - Insomniac
03. "Do You Know? (The Ping Pong Song)"
 Produced By Brian Kidd

Chris Brown - Exclusive
09. "Wall to Wall"
 Produced By Sean Garrett

Santana - Ultimate Santana
02. "This Boy's Fire" (featuring Jennifer Lopez and Baby Bash)

Mary J. Blige - Growing Pains
01. "Work That"
 Produced By Ron "Neff-U" Feemster

Joe - Ain't Nothin' Like Me
03. "If I Want Her"

04. "Where You At" (featuring Papoose)
 Both Produced By Sean Garrett

Omarion - 21
09. "Beg For It"
 Produced By Timbaland & The Royal Court

Mario - Go!
11. "Let Me Watch"
 Produced By Mr. Collipark

Tank - Sex, Love & Pain
12. "I Love Them Girls (Timbaland Remix)"

2008

Raven-Symoné - Raven-Symoné
04. "What Are You Gonna Do?" (featuring Sean Garrett)
 Produced By Sean Garrett, Co-Produced By Walter "Great" Scott

08. "Stupid" (featuring Sean Garrett)

09. "Girl Get It"
 Both Produced By Sean Garrett, Co-Produced By Clubba Langg

11. "Shorts Like Me"
 Produced By Sean Garrett & Elvis Williams

Jesse McCartney - Departure
03. "Rock You" (featuring Sean Garrett)

05. "Into Ya"
 Both Produced By Sean Garrett

04. "How Do You Sleep?"
 Produced By Sean Garrett & Clubba Langg

Usher - Here I Stand
00. "Play Me" (Non-album Track)
 Produced By The Avila Brothers

00. "Still Me" (Non-album Track)
 Produced By The Royal Court - King Logan & Jerome "J-Roc" Harmon

The Pussycat Dolls -  Doll Domination
02. "Bottle Pop" (featuring Snoop Dogg)
 Produced By Fernando Garibay. Coproduced By Clubba Langg

Beyoncé - I Am... Sasha Fierce
03. "Diva"

05. "Video Phone"

 Produced By Bangladesh

2009

Sef - "I Dare You 
00. "Hey"

00. "Dem Girls" (featuring Saigon)

00. "That You Like" (Produced By Big Ben)

 "Don't Stop The Music (Leslie, Garrett, Hilson) 
 Produced By Ryan Leslie

Ciara - Non- Album Tracks
00. Feelin' On My A

00. Darkroom

BoA - BoA
01. "I Did It for Love"
Features and produced by Garrett

02. "Energetic"
Produced by Garrett (Co-Produced by Clubba Langg)

14. "Crazy About"
Produced by Garrett (Co-Produced by Davenport & Spencer)

Mario - D.N.A.
00. "Break-Up"
Produced by Bangladesh

Amerie - In Love & War
00. "Heard 'Em All"
Produced by Garrett (Co-Produced by Eric Hudson)

2010

RichGirl - Non- Album Track
00. "Trouble" (featuring Gucci Mane & Yo Gotti)
Produced by Bangladesh

Teairra Marí - At That Point
00. TBA

Usher - Raymond vs. Raymond
00. "Papers"
Produced by Zaytoven

Nicki Minaj - Pink Friday
00. "Massive Attack"
Produced by Alex Da Kid

Diddy & Dirty Money - Last Train to Paris
00. "Loving You No More"
Produced by Miykal Snoddy

2011

Beyoncé - 4
01. "Lay Up Under Me"
 Produced by Beyoncé Knowles and Shea Taylor

Mary J. Blige - My Life II... The Journey Continues (Act 1)
11. Love a Woman (featuring Beyoncé)
 Produced by Team S. Dot and BridgeTown

2012

B.o.B - Strange Clouds
03. "So Hard to Breathe"

Brandy - Two Eleven
02. "Wildest Dreams"
 Produced by The Bizness

03. "So Sick"
 Produced by Bangladesh

06. "Let Me Go"
 Produced by Bangladesh
 
08. "Put It Down (featuring Chris Brown)"
 Produced by Bangladesh and Dem Jointz

10. "Do You Know What You Have?"
 Produced by Mike Will Made It and P-Nasty

16. "What You Need"
 Produced by Bangladesh

2013

Miley Cyrus - Bangerz
03. SMS (Bangerz) (featuring Britney Spears)
 Produced by Mike Will Made It and Marz

07. Love Money Party (featuring Big Sean)
 Produced by Mike Will Made It and Marz

Mindless Behavior - All Around The World
02. "Keep Her On The Low"
 Produced by Supaman

Dontre - Night To Remember
05. "Spend The Night Out"

12. "Sky High"

2015

Avery Wilson
01. "Change My Mind"

2017

Keke Palmer
01. "Wind Up" (featuring Quavo of Migos)

Sevyn Streeter - Girl Disrupted
12. "How Many" 
 Produced by Squat Beats and Mr. Williams

2019

Jacquees - King of R&B
04. "Come Get It" (featuring YFB)

08. "Warning"

References

External links
 
 
 

Production discographies
Discographies of American artists
 
 
Rhythm and blues discographies
Pop music discographies